Equatorial Guinea is to date the only participating nation that failed to win any medals at the Lusophone Games. They were scheduled to appear in the inaugural tournament, but didn't field any athletes by the time the tournament started. They participated for the first time in the 2009 edition.

Participation by year 
 2009
 2014

Equ
Equatorial Guinea at multi-sport events